The women's 4 x 100 metres relay event at the 2006 Commonwealth Games was held on March 25, 2006

Results

References
Results

Relay
2006
2006 in women's athletics